The 1998 Chicago Fire season was the Chicago Fire Soccer Club's inaugural season of existence, and their first season in Major League Soccer, the top tier of American soccer.

The Chicago Fire enjoyed one of the strongest debuts for an expansion club in the history of American soccer and of the North American sports leagues in general. The Fire won the double by winning both MLS Cup '98 and the 1998 U.S. Open Cup Final, both in a five-day timespan. It was the first time that an expansion franchise in any of the major American sports leagues won the league championship. The next time an expansion franchise would reach the championship of their respective sports league would be 20 years later, when the first-year Vegas Golden Knights NHL ice hockey team reached the 2018 Stanley Cup Finals.

Background 
The last professional soccer club to play in the Chicago area was the Chicago Sting, who played in the original NASL from 1974 to 1983, and then in the Major Indoor Soccer League from 1984 to 1988. The Sting won two Soccer Bowl championships: in 1981 and again in 1984.

The Chicago Fire were one of two new MLS expansion teams to join MLS in 1998, and the first two ever expansion teams in league history. The other team being the now-defunct, Miami Fusion. The Fire were founded on October 8, 1997, on the 126th anniversary of the Great Chicago Fire. The club was named after the event. The club focused on recruiting players of various descent to reflect on the diversity of the region. The team brought in Polish players Piotr Nowak, Jerzy Podbrozny, and Roman Kosecki; the Mexican Jorge Campos; and the Czech Lubos Kubik.

Club

Roster

Team management

Competitive

Major League Soccer

Standings

Western Conference

Overall table

Results by round

Match reports

MLS Cup Playoffs

Western Conference semifinals

Western Conference finals

MLS Cup

U.S. Open Cup

Statistics

Appearances and Goalscorers

|}

Goalscorers

Transfers

Transfers in

Transfers out

Loan in

Loan out

Awards

See also 
 1998 in American soccer

References

External links 
Chicago Fire Soccer Club
Chicago Fire History 1998

1998
Chicago Fire
MLS Cup champion seasons
Chicago Fire
1998 in sports in Illinois
1998